The postorbital process is a projection on the frontal bone near the rear upper edge of the eye socket. In many mammals, it reaches down to the zygomatic arch, forming the postorbital bar.

References

See also
 Orbital process

Skull